Would You Believe may refer to:

Music

Albums
 Would You Believe (Billy Nicholls album) or the title song, 1968
 Would You Believe? (Hollies album), 1966
 Would You Believe, by Ray Charles, 1990

Songs
 "Would You Believe" (song), by Ace of Base, 2015
 "Would You Believe", by Daniel Karlsson aka The Moniker, 2008
 "Would You Believe?", by Roxy Music from Roxy Music, 1972
 "Would You Believe", by Screaming Lord Sutch from Lord Sutch and Heavy Friends, 1970
 "Would You Believe?", by Stereophonics from Scream Above the Sounds, 2017

Television
 Would You Believe? (game show), a 1970-1974 Australian game show
 Would You Believe (TV series), an Irish religious programme

See also
 Would You Believe It!, a 1929 British silent comedy film